Antonio Palumbo (born 6 August 1996) is an Italian professional footballer who plays as a midfielder for Ternana.

Club career
Palumbo started his career at Amici di Mugnano youth academy. Palumbo and teammate Simone Russini were signed by Umbrian side Ternana in 2011. Palumbo made his professional debut in the first match of Ternana in the second round of 2014–15 Coppa Italia. He also played 12 times in 2014–15 Serie B season.

On 6 July 2018, he joined Serie B club Salernitana on a season-long loan. Salernitana held an option to buy him out at the end of the season, which would turn into an obligation to buy if Salernitana  got promoted into Serie A. 

After making only five appearances for Salernitana in the first half of the season, he was recalled from loan. On 25 January 2019, he rejoined Ternana on another loan until the end of 2018–19 season. On 3 August 2019, he returned on loan at Ternana until 30 June 2020 with an option to buy. Upon his return from this loan, he made his Serie A debut for Sampdoria on 2 October 2020 in a game against Fiorentina, he substituted Albin Ekdal in the 84th minute of a 2–1 away victory. On 5 October 2020, he returned to Ternana for his third loan. On 15 June 2021, Ternana exercised their option to purchase his rights and he signed a four-year contract with the club.

International career
Palumbo received his first Italy U-20 team call-up in November 2015, replacing midfielders Lorenzo Pellegrini and Luca Mazzitelli who injured, Alberto Grassi who left for the U21 team. Palumbo was an unused bench against Germany on 12 November.

On 13 November Mazzitelli was returned from injury, but Alberigo Evani the coach still kept Palumbo in the squad, as well as adding Leonardo Capezzi to the call-up. On 17 November Palumbo was featured as a bench warmer again.

References

External links
 
 

1996 births
Footballers from Naples
Living people
Italian footballers
Association football midfielders
Ternana Calcio players
Trapani Calcio players
U.S. Salernitana 1919 players
U.C. Sampdoria players
Serie A players
Serie B players
Serie C players